The Prussian Landkreis Regenwalde in Pomerania was a rural district that existed between 1818 and 1945.

On 1 January 1945 the district included:
 four cities
 Labes
 Plathe
 Regenwalde
 Wangerin
99 more municipalities with fewer than 2,000 inhabitants.

Administrative History

Kingdom of Prussia 
After the reorganization of the district borders in the Kingdom of Prussia following the Congress of Vienna, the rural district of Regenwalde was created in the government region of Stettin in the Prussian province of Pomerania on 1 January 1818.  In 1939, it was reorganized into the government region of Köslin. The district consisted of mostly rural areas around the cities of Labes, Plathe, Regenwalde and Wangerin. The district council was in Labes.

North German Confederation / German Empire 
From 1 July 1867, the district was part of the North German Confederation and from 1 January 1871 it was part of the German Empire.

On 30 September 1929, there was a reorganization of borders in the district of Regenwalde, as in the rest of Prussia, in the course of which all of the formerly independent manors were dissolved and assigned to neighbouring municipalities.

On 1 October 1938, the district of Regenwalde was transferred from the government region of Stettin to the government region of Köslin. As of 1 January 1939,  the district of Regenwalde had the title  (rural district), in accordance with nationwide naming conventions.

In the spring of 1945,  the territory of the district of Regenwalde was occupied by the Red Army, and after the War, it was placed under Polish administration. Today, the area covered by the district is mainly in Łobez County in the West Pomeranian Voivodeship.

Local government 
The district of Regenwalde comprised the urban districts Labes, Plathe, Regenwalde and Wangerin, several rural municipalities and – until their complete dissolution – a number of independent manors.

After the Prussian local government reform of 15 December 1933, from 1 January 1934 there was a uniform local government constitution for all Prussian districts. The former "urban municipalities" were now "towns".

When the German Municipal Code of 30 January 1935 came into force on 1 April 1935, there was a uniform municipal constitution  throughout the Reich, and the former "rural municipalities" became just "municipalities".

No new constitution for the districts was created; the  Kreisordnung für die Provinzen Ost- und Westpreußen, Brandenburg, Pommern, Schlesien and Sachsen of 19 March 1881 remained in effect.

Districts 
In 1932,  there were 19 local government districts in the rural district of Regenwalde:

Municipalities in 1932 
In 1932, the district of Regenwalde included four urban municipalities and 99 rural municipalities:
Towns
 Labes
 Plathe
 Regenwalde
 Wangerin
Rural municipalities

Population 
In 1905, the district had a population of 45,447, of which 45,136 (99.32%) spoke German, 278 (0.61%) spoke Polish, 7 (0.02%) were bilingual and the remainder spoke other languages.

In 1925, the population of the district of Regenwalde was 50,582, of which 48,256 (95.4%) were Protestants, 1,263 (2.5%) were Catholics, 824 (1.6%) were supporters of free churches, and 159 (0.3%) were Jews.

In 1933, the population was 49,753.

District administrators 
 1818-31 Ernst August Philipp von Borcke (1776-1850)
 1832-56 Georg August Adolf Heinrich von der Osten (1785–1855)
 1856-64 Kurt Moritz Lebrech von der Osten (1815–88)
 1864–71 Johann Georg von Loeper (1819–1900)
 1871-77 Ludwig Ferdinand von Lockstedt (1837–1877)
 1877-84 Johann Georg von Loeper (1819–1900)
 1884-93 August Hans Adam Berthold von der Osten (1855-1895)
 1893-1910 Ernst von Döring (1860-1910)
 1910-18 Hans Joachim Philipp Hartwig von Normann (1880-1918)
 1918-31 Herbert Rudolf von Bismarck (1884–1955)
 1931-45 dr Erich Hüttenhein (1889-1945). 
 1945-46 Pełnomocnik Leopold Płachecki (powiat Ławiczka/powiat łobeski)
 1946-48 Leopold Płachecki (powiat łobeski)

Place Names 
The German place names were essentially maintained throughout until 1945.

Transport 
The first railway line in the district, the Stargard-Labes-Belgard line, started operations in 1859 and was run by the  Berlin-Stettiner Eisenbahn-Gesellschaft >111.0<; this line was joined at Ruhnow by a line of the Pommersche Centralbahn to Dramburg ab >111.j<. To the west, as from 1882 there was a line of the Altdamm-Colberger Eisenbahn-Gesellschaft, with the stations Piepenburg und Plathe >111.d<. From 1893,  Piepenburg could be reached from the station Regenwalde South >111.g<.

In 1906, the Prussian state railways opened a subsidiary line to Regenwalde North from Wurow on the Stargard-Belgard line >111.h< and in the following year this was extended to  Regenwalde South >111.g<. From 1909 it was possible to travel from  Regenwalde North toward Wietstock via the new railway junction at Plathe>111.h<.

This 120-kilometre railway network was complemented by 77 kilometres of narrow-gauge railway:

Regenwalder Kleinbahnen AG built their first line from Labes to Meesow, where it branched off to Daber and Sallmow, from where, as from 1907, there was a line to Regenwalde North >113.m+m2<.

(The numbers in >< refer to the German railway timetable 1939.

References

Further reading
 Heimatbuch des Kreises Regenwalde by Gerhard Wachholz, June 1970, published by Ernst Gieseking, Bethel b. Bielefeld
 Der Kreis Regenwalde - Spuren der Erinnerung, Herausgeber Heimatkreis Regenwalde in Zusammenarbeit mit der Patenstadt Melle, 2009.
 Michael Rademacher: Deutsche Verwaltungsgeschichte Provinz Pommern – Landkreis Regenwalde (2006).
 Gunthard Stübs und Pommersche Forschungsgemeinschaft: Der Kreis Regenwalde in der ehemaligen Provinz Pommern (2011)

External links

 http://www.geschichte-on-demand.de/regenwalde.html - Historische Daten 
 http://www.hinterpommern.de/Literatur/Regional/regenwalde.html 

Regenwalde
States and territories established in 1818
States and territories disestablished in 1945
1818 establishments in Prussia
1945 disestablishments in Germany